The Texas Faithful Service Medal is the eleventh highest campaign/service award that may be issued to a service member of the Texas Military Forces. Subsequent awards are denoted by a cactus device.

Eligibility
The Texas Faithful Service Medal is issued to any service member of the Texas Military Forces who:

 Has completed five consecutive and satisfactory years of honorable service
 During which period they have shown fidelity to duty, efficient service, and great loyalty to the State of Texas

Authority

Awarding 
Issuance of the Texas Faithful Service Medal requires authorization by the Texas State Guard Commanding General or a Texas National Guard Lieutenant Colonel, and presentation to the awardee by the next higher level of command.

Legal 
The Texas Faithful Service Medal was originally authorized by the Forty-first Texas Legislature in House Concurrent Resolution Number 8 during the fifth called session 19 February - 20 March 1930 and approved by the Governor Dan Moody on 20 March 1930. It was authorized in its present form by the Fifty-eighth Texas Legislature in Senate Bill Number 279 and approved by the Governor John Connally on 3 May 1963, effective 23 August 1963.

Description

Medal 
The medal pendant is of bronze, 1-1/4 inches in diameter. On the obverse side of the pendant is a sheathed Roman sword, point down, and fronted with crossed branches of olive on the right and in front and live oak on the left, encircled by the words, "FAITHFUL SERVICE" on the upper arc and "TEXAS NATIONAL GUARD" along the lower arc. On the reverse side of the pendant is a five-pointed raised star, one point up, 1/2 of an inch in diameter surrounded by a wreath formed by an olive branch on the right and a live oak branch on the left, surrounded by the words "TEXAS NATIONAL GUARD" along the upper arc and "FOR SERVICE" along the lower arc, in raised letters. The pendant is suspended by a ring from a silk moiré ribbon 1-3/8 inches wide, composed of stripes of red (15/32 of an inch), old gold (7/16 of an inch) and dark blue (15/32 of an inch).

Device 
A bronze cactus leaf, 1/4 inch in length, is issued to denote second and succeeding awards of the Texas Faithful Service Medal. A silver cactus leaf is worn instead of five bronze cactus leaves. A silver cactus leaf is worn to the wearer's right of a bronze cactus leaf. Cactus leaves will be worn centered on the suspension ribbon and service ribbon. Up to four cactus leaves will be worn side by side on the service ribbon.

Notable recipients

See also 

 Awards and decorations of the Texas Military
 Awards and decorations of the Texas government
 Texas Military Forces
 Texas Military Department
 List of conflicts involving the Texas Military

References 

Texas
Texas Military Forces
Texas Military Department